Leptoboea is a genus of flowering plants belonging to the family Gesneriaceae.

Its native range is Himalaya to Southern Central China and Indo-China.

Species:

Leptoboea glabra 
Leptoboea multiflora

References

Didymocarpoideae
Gesneriaceae genera